State Road 442 (SR 442) is a short east–west route in Volusia County connecting U.S. Route 1 (US 1) in Edgewater with Interstate 95 (I-95) at exit 244. The road is named Indian River Boulevard.

Route description
West of I-95, the paved road begins as the unsigned County Road 442 (CR 442) providing access to rural ranches. The divided highway runs for about  before transitioning to SR 442 just west of the I-95 interchange. After the interchange, Indian River Boulevard continues east-northwest as a divided highway passing under a pedestrian bridge for the East Central Regional Rail Trail and intersecting Old Mission Road (CR 4137). After spending its first  in a more rural section of the city, the two roadway carriages come together and pass through a residential neighborhood of Edgewater. SR 442 crosses a railroad and enters a more commercialized part of the city. The state highway ends at a signalized intersection with US 1 (SR 5) with the road continuing east for another  as East Indian River Boulevard.

Major intersections

References

External links

442
442
442